York Aerodrome  is a registered aerodrome located  northeast of York, in Haldimand County, Ontario, Canada. York is a community south of Hamilton near Caledonia.

The private airfield caters to general aviation and is surrounded by agricultural land on Regional Road 9 (York Road) between Highway 54 and Highway 56.

References

Registered aerodromes in Ontario